Cryptocephalus octomaculatus is a species of cylindrical leaf beetles belonging to the family Chrysomelidae, subfamily Cryptocephalinae.

Description
The basic color of pronotum and elytra is pale brown. Elytra show eight small blackish spots (hence the species name octomaculatus meaning with eight stains in Latin). The aberration duodecimpunctatus Fabricius 1792 bears an additional spot at the apex of the elytra.

Beetles of this quite rare species can be found from July to September on the twigs and leaves of oak, birch and hazel.

Distribution
This species can be found in Bosnia, Bulgaria, Croatia, Czech Republic, France, Germany, Hungary, Italy, Poland, Romania, Slovakia, former Yugoslavia, Ukraine and in the Near East.

References

External links
 The Macroid Club
 Le monde des insectes

octomaculatus
Beetles of Europe
Beetles described in 1790